Stearyl alcohol, or 1-octadecanol, is an organic compound classified as a saturated fatty alcohol with the formula CH3(CH2)16CH2OH. It takes the form of white granules or flakes, which are insoluble in water. It has a wide range of uses as an ingredient in lubricants, resins, perfumes, and cosmetics. It is used as an emollient, emulsifier, and thickener in ointments, and is widely used as a hair coating in shampoos and hair conditioners. Stearyl heptanoate, the ester of stearyl alcohol and heptanoic acid (enanthic acid), is found in most cosmetic eyeliners. Stearyl alcohol has also found application as an evaporation suppressing monolayer when applied to the surface of water.

Stearyl alcohol is prepared from stearic acid or some fats by the process of catalytic hydrogenation.  It has low toxicity.

References

External links 
 International Programme on Chemical Safety

Fatty alcohols
Non-ionic surfactants
Primary alcohols
Alkanols